Félix Torres Amat or Félix Torres i Amat de Palou (6 August 1772 – 29 December 1849) was a Spanish Bishop. He translated the Bible into vernacular Spanish and published a record of leading authors in Catalan.

Life
Torres Amat, born in Barcelona in 1772, was the son of Joseph Torres and Teresa Amat. He studied languages before joining his uncle Felix Amat in Tarragona where he obtained a doctorate in Philosophy. He then taught philosophy, mathematics and theology becoming Canon of the Collegiate Church of San Ildefonso on May 5, 1806.

New Bible

In 1824, he published a translation of the Bible in vernacular Spanish which had been entrusted to him by the Spanish kings Carlos IV and Fernando VII.  This caused some criticism as both he and his father had become associated with Jansenism, and he had to retire to a monastery for some time. On May 1, 1834 he was ordained as the Bishop of Astorga, and in the following year, he met William Harris Rule from Gibraltar as they both shared a common interest in distributing the Bible in people's first languages. Torres Amat had had difficulty publishing his translation, and he had relied on money from Anglicans in London.

Torres Amat was elected to the prestigious Real Academia Española where he briefly held the "T Seat."

Apart from the translation of the Bible, his best-known work is Reports to help form a critical dictionary of Catalan writers and give some idea of the ancient and modern literature of Catalonia. This was based on the work of his brother who had been a leading librarian in Barcelona and he had started to record notable Catalan authors.

Torres Amat died in Madrid on December 29, 1847.

Works
Treaty of the Church of Jesus Christ, Madrid, 1793–1805.
Succinct account of the funeral honors ... Maria Isabel Francisca de Braganza. Barcelona, 1819.
Art of living in peace, Barcelona, 1821.
The happiness of Christian death, 1832.
Life of the Hon. Mr. D. Felix Amat, Madrid, 1835, with an appendix, Madrid, 1838.
Reports to help form a critical dictionary of Catalan writers and give some idea of the ancient and modern literature of Catalonia, Barcelona, 1836.
Pastoral, Madrid, 1838.
Advantages of a good Christian, Astorga, 1839.
Catholic Apology ... Observations of the Archbishop of Palmyra peaceful, Madrid, 1843.
Translation of the Bible into Spanish, 1823.

References

1772 births
1849 deaths
People from Barcelona
18th-century translators
Spanish translators
19th-century translators
Translators of the Bible into Spanish